The 2019 season of the Taiwan Football Premier League (TFPL) is the third season of top-flight association football competition in Taiwan under its current format. The Taiwan Football Premier League includes eight teams. The season began on 14 April 2019.

Teams

A total of eight teams compete in the league. Tatung are the defending champions. Royal Blues and NSTC F.C. were relegated from last season, and were replaced by Taichung Futuro and Ming Chuan University, which were the top two teams of the qualifying tournament held in December 2018.

 F.C. Taipei Red Lions (F.C. 台北紅獅), previously named Taicheng Lions (F.C. 台程獅)
 Hang Yuen F.C. (航源 F.C.)
 Hasus TSU F.C. (台灣體大, previously named 台體光磊 F.C.)
 Ming Chuan University F.C. (銘傳大學 F.C.)
 Taichung Futuro (台中 FUTURO F.C.)
 Taipower F.C. (高市台電 F.C.)
 Tatung F.C. (北市大同 F.C.)
 Taiwan Steel F.C. (台灣鋼鐵 F.C.), previously named Tainan City (台南市 F.C.)

League table

Results

source = CTFA

Top scorers

As of 21 August 2019

References

External links
Chinese Taipei Football Association

Taiwan Football Premier League seasons
Taiwan
1